Ardonea judaphila is a moth of the subfamily Arctiinae. It was first described by Schaus in 1905 and is found in French Guiana.

References

Moths described in 1905
Lithosiini
Moths of South America